Richard Ellison (1754 – 7 July 1827) was a British politician.

He was the eldest son of Richard Ellison, banker, of Sudbrooke Holme, Lincolnshire.

He was appointed High Sheriff of Lincolnshire in 1793 and was Member of Parliament (MP) for Lincoln from 1796 to 1812, and for Wootton Bassett from 1813 to 1820. He became Recorder of Lincoln and a member of the Board of Agriculture (1798).

He married twice; firstly Hannah, the daughter of John Cookson of Whitehill, co. Durham and secondly Jane Maxwell, with whom he had 4 sons. He also had an illegitimate daughter.

Richard Ellison MP is the great-great-great grandfather of Richard Ellison (cricketer).

References

External links 

 Richard Ellison (1754-1827) in The History of Parliament

1754 births
1827 deaths
Members of the Parliament of Great Britain for Lincoln
British MPs 1796–1800
Members of the Parliament of the United Kingdom for Lincoln
Members of the Parliament of the United Kingdom for Wootton Bassett
UK MPs 1801–1802
UK MPs 1802–1806
UK MPs 1806–1807
UK MPs 1807–1812
UK MPs 1812–1818
UK MPs 1818–1820
High Sheriffs of Lincolnshire